Frank Sexton (1914–February 1990) was an American professional wrestler in the early to mid-twentieth century.  Along with Orville Brown, Bill Longson, and Lou Thesz, he was one of the biggest stars of the 1940s.  A multiple-time world champion, his most significant run was as the Boston American Wrestling Association (AWA) World Heavyweight Champion from June 27, 1945 until May 23, 1950, when he lost the championship to Don Eagle in Cleveland, Ohio. Sexton died in 1990.

Championships and accomplishments

American Wrestling Association (Boston)
AWA World Heavyweight Championship (2 times)
National Wrestling Alliance
NWA British Empire Heavyweight Championship (Toronto version) (1 time)
NWA Pacific Coast Heavyweight Championship (San Francisco version) (4 times)
Maryland State Athletic Commission
World Heavyweight Championship (Maryland version) (1 time) - unifies with Boston AWA World Heavyweight Championship
Montreal Athletic Commission
World Heavyweight Championship (Montreal version) (1 time)
Midwest Wrestling Association
MWA Ohio Heavyweight Championship (1 time)
Other titles
World Heavyweight Championship (Europe version) (1 time)
Wrestling Observer Newsletter awards
Wrestling Observer Newsletter Hall of Fame (Class of 2000)

Further reading
Hornbaker, Tim. National Wrestling Alliance: The Untold Story of the Monopoly that Strangled Pro Wrestling. Toronto: ECW Press, 2007.

References

General

Specific

External links
 A biography of Orville Brown containing references to Sexton
 Frank Sexton at Cagematch.net
 Frank Sexton at Legacyofwrestling.com
 Frank Sexton at Wrestlingdata.com
 Frank Sexton at Wrestlingheritage.co.uk
 Frank Sexton at WrestlingScout
 Professional wrestling record for Frank Sexton from The Internet Wrestling Database

1914 births
1990 deaths
American male professional wrestlers
People from Madison County, Ohio
20th-century American male actors
20th-century professional wrestlers
NWA British Empire Heavyweight Champions (Toronto version)